William Percival Johnson (12 March 1854 in St Helens, Isle of Wight – October 1928 in Liuli, Tanganyika) was an Anglican missionary to Nyasaland. After education at Bedford School (1863–1873) and graduation from University College, Oxford, he went to Africa with the Universities' Mission to Central Africa, under the Bishop Edward Steere.

He translated the Bible into the Likoma Island dialect of Chinyanja, under the title  which was published in 1912. Together with another Universities' Mission missionary, Arthur Glossop (1867-1949), he also translated the Book of Common Prayer into Chinyanja (1897, revised 1909).

Johnson also published two other books: Nyasa, the Great Water, being a Description of the Lake and the Life of the People (Oxford University Press, 1922) and My African Reminiscences, 1875-1895 (London: Universities Mission to Central Africa, 1925).

He died at Liuli, Mbinga District, on the shores of what is today the Tanzanian side of Lake Malawi in 1928, the site of the largest mission in the Ruvuma region of Tanzania. He is regarded locally as a saint and there is a "St Johnson's Day" celebrated. Local demands for his canonization were referred by letter to the Lambeth Conference in 1958, where a compromise that he was regarded as "Blessed" was offered. The Anglican Diocese of South West Tanganyika continues to regard Johnson as a saint.

References

External links
First three pages of Genesis in Johnson's translation, in various formats
Johnson's translation of the Book of Common Prayer together with information about the translation by Richard J. Mammana.
The entire Book of Common Prayer in Chinyanja in pdf format

1854 births
1928 deaths
Translators of the Bible into Bantu languages
Anglican missionaries in Malawi
Cambridge University Boat Club rowers
English Anglican missionaries
Anglican missionaries in Tanzania
People educated at Bedford School
Alumni of University College, Oxford
Nyasaland people
Missionary linguists
Linguists of Chewa